Crewe Gresty Lane TMD (officially Gresty Bridge TMD) is a traction maintenance depot in Crewe, Cheshire, England. The depot is situated on the southern side of the line to Shrewsbury.

History
The site was originally used by the Great Western Railway, and opened around 1905 as a wagon works. The present depot was opened by Direct Rail Services (DRS) in 2007.

Present
The depot is used for servicing the DRS fleet of diesel locomotives, including Classes 20, 37, 47 and 66.

References

Sources

Railway depots in England
Buildings and structures in Crewe
Rail transport in Cheshire